Bath fizzies are material products designed to effervesce in bathwater.  They come in the form of:
 amorphous grains of homogeneous mixture, packaged in a box, jar, or envelope;
 single-use envelopes of mixed powders; and
 solid boluses of homogeneous or inhomogeneous mixture called bath bombs.

Bath fizzies date from the early 20th Century and may be considered a form of bath salts in that the products of their use include a salt solution in addition to the carbon dioxide bubbles which are their definitive feature.  Their ingredients must include one or more acid(s) and one or more water-soluble bicarbonate, sesquicarbonate, and/or carbonate.  In addition they commonly include coloring, fragrance, and/or other water-soluble, water-dispersible, and/or volatile ingredients for esthetic, cosmetic, or skin soothing purposes.  This principle of effervescing while releasing other ingredients is the same that has been used by tableted products for children to produce their own carbonated beverages.  In principle a fizzie could release phosphoric anhydride gas, but the release of gas from phosphate salts is so slow that any phosphates present in either beverage or bath fizzies are for other purposes.

Bath fizzies are considered a type of bubble bath product by those using the phrase to refer to baths with bubbles within the water or products for producing such an effect, and should hence be distinguished from foaming products that produce bubbles on top of bath water, also referred to as bubble baths.  The bubbles from a fizzie tend to nucleate on and thereby tickle the bather under the water.  There have been combination products used to produce both fizzing and foaming effects with baths.

See also
Bubble bath

Bathing

ja:入浴剤